Joseph Edgar Maddy (October 14, 1892 – April 18, 1966) was a pioneering American music educator and conductor.

He was born in Wellington, Kansas where both of his parents were teachers. He attended Wichita College of Music in Wichita, Kansas where he studied violin and later joined the Minneapolis Symphony Orchestra. He was also the first music supervisor of instrumental music in America in 1918 in Rochester, New York.  After a short time in Rochester, he was encouraged by Will Earhart to take a job at Morton High School in Richmond, Indiana to revive the outstanding school and community music program Earhart had developed there some years earlier.  He remained in Richmond for four years.

In 1924 Maddy was invited to Ann Arbor to be the supervisor of music in public schools and the Music Department head for the University of Michigan, where he developed one of the few conducting courses in the country. and also conducted the Michigan All State High School Orchestra.   While teaching in 1925, Maddy organized the first National High School Orchestra to play for the Music Supervisors National Conference (MSNC) in Detroit in 1926.    In 1927, Maddy was invited to bring the National High School Orchestra of over 250 High School musicians from 39 states, to the MSNC in Dallas that year.

While in Ann Arbor, Maddy also pursued other approaches to music education by developing teaching materials in collaboration with Thaddeus P. Giddings for a radio teaching program.   The radio program taught band and orchestra instrumentation with instruction books distributed by NBC.    By 1936 their radio program aired five times per week, and believed to have reached 225,000 student listeners.  It was sustained until 1940, and employed professional musicians to help with technique demonstrations.

In 1928 Maddy formed the National High School Orchestra and Band Camp, incorporated as the National High School Orchestra Camp on July 6, 1927.   The camp exists today as the Interlochen Center for the Arts, and has spawned several complementary entities including Interlochen Arts Academy, Interlochen College of the Creative Arts and Interlochen Public Radio in Interlochen, Michigan.

In 1941, Maddy became the Ann Arbor Symphony Orchestra's fourth music director after conductor William Champion was called into service with the United States Navy. In honor of Champion, Maddy led the orchestra in a song pageant, “Battle Songs of Freedom,” at the U. S. Navy Service School in Dearborn, Michigan in 1942. Maddy maintained strong ties to the National Music Camp at Interlochen and helped to establish the Langford youth scholarships along with symphony supporters. This scholarship enabled local students to attend the camp. By 1949, Maddy had grown the orchestra to a full-sized symphony with seventy-five musicians listed in the orchestra's attendance book. He was succeeded by Orien Dalley in 1951.

Maddy published and collaborated on a number of instructional materials and courses for elementary band and orchestra including the Universal Teacher, Tritone Folio, the Willis Graded School Orchestra and Band Series, and the Modern School Graded Orchestra Books.

He was a member of the Epsilon chapter of Phi Mu Alpha Sinfonia, and a recipient of the Charles E. Lutton Man of Music Award.

He was a National Patron of Delta Omicron, an international professional music fraternity, and he received an honorary degree from Earlham College in 1965.

In 2020, M-137, a highway serving Interlochen Center for the Arts, was decommissioned by the Michigan Department of Transportation. Upon the roadway's handover to the Grand Traverse County Road Commission, the roadway was renamed to the "J. Maddy Parkway".

References

External links

1890s births
1966 deaths
American music educators
People from Wellington, Kansas
People from Richmond, Indiana
People from Grand Traverse County, Michigan
Interlochen summer faculty
Schoolteachers from Indiana
University of Michigan faculty
Place of death missing
20th-century American educators